See Gokalpura for namesakes
Gokalpura is a village and former petty princely state in Gujarat, western India.

History
The non-jurisdictional (e)state in Mahi Kantha was part of Katosan thana and had no separate chief but was ruled by the Koli shareholder Chieftains of Tejpura, in whose state revenue its own was included.

In 1901 it has a population of 184, paying a separate 42 Rupees tribute to the Gaekwar Baroda State.

External links
 Imperial Gazetteer on dsal.uchicago.edu - Mahi Kantha

Villages in Mehsana district
Princely states of Gujarat
Koli princely states